The 2014–15 Seattle Redhawks men's basketball team represented Seattle University during the 2014–15 NCAA Division I men's basketball season. The Redhawks, led by sixth year head coach Cameron Dollar, played their home games at KeyArena, with three home game at the Connolly Center, and were members of the Western Athletic Conference. They finished the season 18–16, 7–7 in WAC play to finish in a tie for fourth place. They advanced to the championship game of the WAC tournament where they lost to New Mexico State. They were invited to the College Basketball Invitational where they defeated Pepperdine in the first round and Colorado in the quarterfinals before losing in the semifinals to Loyola–Chicago.

Previous season
The Redhawks finished the season 13–17, 5–11 in WAC play to finish in a three way tie for seventh place. They lost in the quarterfinals of the WAC tournament to New Mexico State.

Off season

Departures

2014 incoming recruits

Roster

Schedule

|-
!colspan=9 style="background:#BA0C2F; color:#FFFFFF;"| Non-Conference Regular season

|-
!colspan=9 style="background:#BA0C2F; color:#FFFFFF;"| WAC Regular season

|-
!colspan=9 style="background:#BA0C2F; color:#FFFFFF;"| WAC tournament

|-
!colspan=9 style="background:#BA0C2F; color:#FFFFFF;"| College Basketball Invitational

References

Seattle Redhawks men's basketball seasons
Seattle
Seattle Redhawks men's basketball
Seattle Redhawks men's basketball
Seattle
Seattle Redhawks
Seattle Redhawks